The frontal gyri are four gyri of the frontal lobe in the brain. These are four horizontally oriented, parallel convolutions, of the frontal lobe. The other main gyrus of the frontal lobe is the precentral gyrus which is vertically oriented, and runs parallel with the precentral sulcus.

The uppermost of the four gyri is the superior frontal gyrus, below this is the middle frontal gyrus, and below this is the inferior frontal gyrus. Continuing from the superior frontal gyrus on the lateral surface, into the uppermost part of the medial surface of the hemisphere is the medial frontal gyrus. The inferior frontal gyrus includes Broca's area. The lowest part of the inferior frontal gyrus rests on the orbital part of the frontal bone.

Gyri

Superior 
The superior frontal gyrus makes up about a third of the frontal lobe. It is bounded laterally by the superior frontal sulcus.

Medial

Middle 
It has been recently found that this region participates during linguistic tasks. More precisely, during interactive communication it is active during a phase of response planning.

Inferior 
The inferior frontal gyrus includes Broca's area.

References 

Gyri